Charles Walcott may refer to:

 Charles Walcott (MP) (1733–1799), British politician
 Charles F. Walcott (1836–1887), American Union brevet brigadier general during the American Civil War
 Charles Doolittle Walcott (1850–1927), American invertebrate paleontologist